Stratford Springs, located near Wheeling, Ohio County, West Virginia, US, is a nationally recognized historic district called the Wheeling Country Club. The country club operated from this location until 1980 when it moved to its present facilities. The district includes four contributing buildings; the former Club House (1902), Franzheim Bungalow, the former Pro and Caddy House, and the former Servant's Residence. The former clubhouse was designed by noted Wheeling architect Frederick F. Faris (1870-1927). Hole 13 green and hole 14 teeing ground now abut the former clubhouse. The historic district was listed on the National Register of Historic Places in 1990.

References

Buildings and structures in Wheeling, West Virginia
Bungalow architecture in West Virginia
Clubhouses on the National Register of Historic Places in West Virginia
Golf clubs and courses in West Virginia
Historic districts on the National Register of Historic Places in West Virginia
Queen Anne architecture in West Virginia
National Register of Historic Places in Wheeling, West Virginia
Historic districts in Wheeling, West Virginia
American Craftsman architecture in West Virginia
Shingle Style architecture in West Virginia